You Got It was the second full-length album from Boston, Massachusetts hardcore punk/speed metal band, Gang Green.

It was released in 1987, a year after their previous release, Another Wasted Night, in 1986. It was their first for a major record label – Roadrunner Records – after leaving independent punk label, Taang.

Chris Doherty and Brian Betzger were the only surviving members from the previous album. Joe Gittleman replaced Glen Stilphen on bass, and Fritz Ericson replaced Chuck Stilphen on lead guitar after "a major dispute". The brothers had since formed a band of their own called Mallethead.

Overview

Earlier versions of "Let's Drink Some Beer" and "Another Bomb" can be found on the German version of the band's debut LP "Another Wasted Night" on Funhouse Records. A live version of "Haunted House" had previously appeared on the U.S. cassette version of "Another Wasted Night" on Taang! Records.

The Re-Release came as double-CD version featuring the tracks from the follow-up album "Older...Budweiser".

Track listing
All songs written by Chris Doherty, unless stated
First Keg
"Haunted House"	–	1:39
"We'll Give It To You"	–	3:12
"Sheet Rock"	–	3:53
"Ballerina Massacre" (Brian Betzger)	–	3:59
"Born to Rock"	(Doherty, Betzger, Joe Gittleman) –	4:36
"Another Bomb"	–	2:46
"L.D.S.B." (Doherty, D Barret)	–	1:11
Second Keg
"Whoever Said" 	–	3:36
"Party With the Devil"	–	3:56
"Somethings"	–	2:32
"The Climb" (Doherty, Betzger)	–	4:09
"Sick, Sex, Six" (Betzger)	–	6:11

Credits
 Chris Doherty – vocals, guitar
 Fritz Erickson – guitar
 Joe Gittleman – bass
 Brian Betzger – drums
 Thom Moore and Rob Peters – background vocals
 Tony Nichols – additional guitar tracks – was in the band from November, 1986 but left to form Meliah Rage before its release
 Recorded in 1987 at Blue Jay Recording Studio, Boston, Massachusetts, USA
 Produced and engineered by Thom Moore
 Assistant engineered by Mark Wessels
 Mastered at Masterdisk, New York, USA
 Logo artwork by Mark Falls

References

External links
Taang Records band page
Trouserpress entry for Gang Green
More info on Gang Green

1987 albums
Gang Green albums